Ida G. Ruben (born January 7, 1929) is an American politician who served in the Maryland House of Delegates from the 20th district from 1975 to 1987 and in the Maryland Senate from the 20th district from 1987 to 2007.

Ruben was first elected to the House of Delegates in 1974, filling a seat that had been vacated by her husband, Leonard Ruben, who was appointed to a judgeship. She became a State Senator in 1987 and served in the chamber for 20 years, rising to the position of president pro tem before losing her seat in 2006 election.

References

1929 births
Living people
Democratic Party members of the Maryland House of Delegates
Democratic Party Maryland state senators
Women state legislators in Maryland
20th-century American politicians
20th-century American women politicians
21st-century American women